South Carolina Highway 295 (SC 295) is a  state highway in the northwestern part of the U.S. state of South Carolina. It connects the Spartanburg County communities of Pacolet and Una.

Major intersections

See also

References

External links

SC 295 at Virginia Highways' South Carolina Highways Annex

295
Transportation in Spartanburg County, South Carolina
Spartanburg, South Carolina